Patricia O'Connor ( Yuke, born 1928) is an Australian Aboriginal elder of the Yugambeh people. She is known for her work in reviving the Yugambeh language and opening the Yugambeh Museum. In 2014 she received the NAIDOC Award for Female Elder of the Year, and in 2019 she was named a Queensland Great.

Early and personal life

O'Connor was born Patricia Yuke in Beaudesert, Queensland in 1928 to mother Edith Graham and father Stanley Yuke, who also had two other children. She grew up near Kooralbyn in the Scenic Rim Region. She is a member of the Yugambeh people, an Australian Aboriginal group whose traditional lands are located in South East Queensland and the Northern Rivers area of New South Wales. She later married Terrence Michael O'Connor, and had 7 children, including Rory O'Connor and a daughter, Faith.

Career

O'Connor has spent much of her life working as an advocate for Yugambeh issues. In the 1980s, for example, she was part of a team which negotiated the largest ever repatriation of Aboriginal remains. Then, in 1991, she and her sister Ysola Best led the organisation and installation of the Yugambeh War Memorial in Jebribillum Bora Park, Burleigh Heads, which was the first war memorial in Australia dedicated to Indigenous soldiers.

In 2018 she played a prominent role during the Commonwealth Games, which were being held on the Gold Coast that year, as a traditional custodian of the land on which the event was being held. She accompanied Queen Elizabeth II on stage at the launch of the Queen's Baton Relay at Buckingham Palace, and the baton itself was made partly of macadamia wood because of a story told by O'Connor to its designers. She also gave the Welcome to Country at the opening ceremony.

She is, however, probably best known for her work in restoring the Yugambeh language. In the 1980s, the language was considered by academics to be dead before O'Connor and her sister began to record it in an attempt at revival. She opened the Yugambeh Museum to help with this goal and, as a result, the language is now taught in numerous schools and education centres as of 2020.

Honours

In 2014, O'Connor received the Female Elder of the Year award at the NAIDOC Awards.

Then, in 2019, the Queensland Government named her a Queensland Great, an honour which "recognises the efforts and achievements of remarkable individuals... for their invaluable contribution to the history and development of [the] state".

References

External links
 Patricia O'Connor's profile on AustLit

Living people
1928 births
Queensland Greats
Australian Aboriginal elders
Australian women activists
Australian activists
20th-century Australian women
21st-century Australian women